Ribeirão is a city located in the state of Pernambuco, Brazil. Located  at 87 km away from Recife, capital of the state of Pernambuco. Has an estimated (IBGE 2020) population of 47,616 inhabitants.

Geography
 State - Pernambuco
 Region - Zona da mata Pernambucana
 Boundaries - Amaraji, Escada and Primavera   (N);  Gameleira    (S);  Sirinhaém  (E);  Joaquim Nabuco, Água Preta and Cortês   (W)
 Area - 287.98 km2
 Elevation - 97 m
 Hydrography - Sirinhaém River
 Vegetation - Subperenifólia forest
 Climate - Hot tropical and humid
 Annual average temperature - 25.1 c
 Distance to Recife - 87 km

Economy
The main economic activities in Ribeirão are based in the metallurgy industry, commerce and agribusiness, especially sugarcane, bananas, manioc; and livestock such as cattle, buffalos, goats and sheep.

Economic indicators

Economy by Sector
2006

Health indicators

References

Municipalities in Pernambuco